Mauricio Alberto Alfaro Valladares (born 13 February 1956) is a former soccer professional player from El Salvador, who represented his country at the 1982 FIFA World Cup in Spain.

Club career
Nicknamed El Tuco, Alfaro started his career at Platense and later joined Salvadoran giants FAS in 1983.

With FAS he won a league title in 1984. He finished his career with Cojutepeque, with whom he lost the 1988/89 national league final to Luis Ángel Firpo.

International career
He made his debut for El Salvador in 1979, and has earned over 15 caps.

He has represented his country in 10 FIFA World Cup qualification matches and played in the 1982 FIFA World Cup final group stage match, against Argentina.

Managerial career
His first job was at Platense, where he was dismissed in January 2005.

He has coached varies clubs in the lower leagues of El Salvador, such as Telecom, Coca-Cola, Municipal and San Rafael F.C..

He was coached of El Salvador U-21 and El Salvador U-20, who he helped qualify for the 2010 Central American and Caribbean Games in Mayagüez, Puerto Rico and the 2013 FIFA U-20 World Cup.

He helped to El Salvador U-20 become the first Salvadoran team to win a game at a FIFA U-20 World Cup, by defeating the Australia team 2–1.

Later, he coached in the Primera División de El Salvador for the first time in 2016, leading the recently promoted Municipal Limeño in the Apertura 2016 campaign.

He later resigned, which came as a shock as he amassed a respectable five wins and six draws from seventeen games, he cited crowd problems and clashes with several players, as the main reasons.

Honors

Playing

Club
FAS
Primera División Winner (1): 1984

Manager

National Team
Third Place

Managerial stats

References

1956 births
Living people
People from La Paz Department (El Salvador)
Association football forwards
Salvadoran footballers
El Salvador international footballers
1982 FIFA World Cup players
Alianza F.C. footballers
C.D. FAS footballers
Municipal Limeño managers
Salvadoran football managers